The West Chester Railroad is a privately owned and operated tourist railroad that runs between Market Street in West Chester, Pennsylvania, in Chester County, and the village of Glen Mills, Pennsylvania, in Delaware County.

It is owned by the for-profit 4 States Railway Service, Inc. and operated by the West Chester Railroad Heritage Association, a non-profit organization dedicated to the preservation of the railroad. All employees of the railroad are volunteers.

Equipment roster

Proposed commuter rail reactivation
In 2018 the Pennsylvania Department of Transportation commissioned a feasibility study for rebuilding the line and restoring direct commuter rail service from West Chester to Philadelphia 30th Street Station. SEPTA service below the Elwyn station was terminated in 1986 due to low ridership and unsafe track conditions but the area has since grown in population and has few transportation alternatives.  The study concluded that restoration was feasible but the projected ridership was not high enough to qualify for capital funding.  In September 2021 local officials proposed a short-term plan to upgrade the trackage in order to provide a shuttle service between the line's Market Street station in West Chester and SEPTA's new Wawa station.  The WCRR's sub-lease of the tracks expires in April 2023.  As of December 2022 the boro was considering a renewal for only one year while the railroad argued that it needed a long term in order that have a business plan for necessary maintenance and upgrades.

See also
List of heritage railroads in the United States
Media/Wawa Line
Woodland Station

References

External links

6ABC Action News - Preserving the West Chester Railroad

Heritage railroads in Pennsylvania
Tourist attractions in Delaware County, Pennsylvania
Tourist attractions in Chester County, Pennsylvania
West Chester, Pennsylvania